Gimv is a Belgian European investment company with experience in private equity and venture capital. Gimv is listed on Euronext Brussels and manages around 1.5 billion EUR  invested in about 60 portfolio companies.

Gimv identifies entrepreneurial and innovative companies with high-growth potential. Gimv’s five investment platforms are: Connected Consumer, Life Sciences, Health & Care, Smart Industries and Sustainable Cities.

See also
 Biotech Fund Flanders
 Flanders Institute of Biotechnology (VIB)
 Venture capital

References

External links

Companies based in Antwerp
Private equity firms of Europe
Companies in the BEL Mid Index